James Alway Ross (January 13, 1869 – May 22, 1945) was a Canadian politician, businessperson and poet. He represented Monck in the Legislative Assembly of Ontario from 1908 to 1911 as a Conservative.

The son of William Nelson Ross and Lydia Tufford, he was born in St Anns, Ontario and grew up there. Ross taught in the model school in Welland and then at Wellandport. He was principal at Scott Street School in St. Thomas when he resigned in 1896 to go into business.

In 1893, he married Sarah Agnes Kay.

He was elected to the Ontario assembly for Monck in 1908.

A member of the Canadian Writers' Association, he was the author of a volume of poetry which included poems such as "Canada First" and "Dominion Day".

Ross died in St. Catharines General Hospital at the age of 76, after being ill for three months.

His son Murray G. Ross was founding president of York University.

References 

1869 births
1945 deaths
Progressive Conservative Party of Ontario MPPs
Canadian male poets
20th-century Canadian male writers
20th-century Canadian poets
20th-century Canadian politicians
People from the Regional Municipality of Niagara